Nieuwesteeg Heritage Rose Garden is a collection of rare and unusual roses, mostly hybrid teas, bred in the early 20th century. The rose garden was established from 2009, with stock donated by rosarian John Nieuwesteeg.

History of the park 
Originally a police paddock, Maddingley Park was fitted out for picknickers and other day visitors from Melbourne when the railway station at Bacchus Marsh opened in 1887. The Dickie bandstand was built in 1905 and, by the Second World War, the park had developed gardens and landscaping features, many of which have since been lost. Today, the park contains a football and cricket oval, grass tennis courts and a netball court. There are many large 19th-century tree specimens and a second Memorial Rose Garden on the north side, near the park's north-west entrance on Bacchus Marsh–Geelong road.

The Nieuwesteeg Heritage Rose Garden 
The garden is located on the south side of the park, near the entrance from Bacchus Marsh railway station. It consists of 40 heritage roses. There is a substantial group bred or found in Australia, including rarities by Alister Clark, Olive Fitzhardinge, Frank Riethmuller and Patrick Grant. Others are unusual or unique in Australian public collections. The true 'Mlle de Sombreuil' is also found here. Some roses, such as Peter Lambert's 'Frau Karl Druschki', became the parents of hundreds of others.

Six beds of roses are arranged from north-west to south-east around the bandstand. More roses climb up the base of the bandstand itself. Two hedges of the China rose 'Mutabilis' frame the collection to the west and east.

The garden was established with support from John Nieuwesteeg (pronounced New-Steeg), a Yellingbo rosarian who identified many of the lost roses of Alister Clark and holds a significant collection of Clark and other old roses for the Garden Plant Conservation Association of Australia.

The Maddingley Park roses are a selection from his personal holdings and he gave about 26 roses over four years. From 2009 they were planted there by the Friends of Maddingley Park to complement the bandstand. About a tenth of the roses have not survived. The garden was named after John Nieuwesteeg in 2011.

Catalogue of the roses
This catalogue raisonné collates maps and lists supplied by Friends of Maddingley Park, the Peter Cox reference book Australian Roses and the website Help Me Find Roses. The Sydney-bred 'Midnight Sun' in Bed 5 appears to have died and not been replaced. Most of the photos were taken in the Nieuwesteeg Heritage Rose Garden itself.

Bed 1

Bed 2

Bed 3

Bed 4

Bed 5

Bed 6

Hedges

Bandstand

References

Rose gardens in Australia
Gardens in Victoria (Australia)
Parks in Victoria (Australia)
2009 establishments in Australia
Bacchus Marsh